Pierre Magne (Livry-Gargan, Seine-Saint-Denis, 9 November 1905 – Livry-Gargan, 14 November 1980) was a French professional road bicycle racer. Magne won one stage in the 1928 Tour de France, and finished 6th in the 1930 Tour de France. Pierre Magne was the younger brother of Tour de France winner Antonin Magne.

Major results

1927
1927 Tour de France:
15th place overall classification
1928
1928 Tour de France:
Winner stage 15
10th place overall classification
1929
1929 Tour de France:
9th place overall classification
Tour de Corrèze
1930
1930 Tour de France:
6th place overall classification
1931
Circuit du Gers
1932
GP de "L'Echo d'Alger"
1933
Circuit de Béarn
Circuit de Cantal

External links 

Official Tour de France results for Pierre Magne

1905 births
1980 deaths
People from Livry-Gargan
French male cyclists
French Tour de France stage winners
Sportspeople from Seine-Saint-Denis
Cyclists from Île-de-France